The Swift Creek Reservoir is a , , man made lake in Chesterfield County, Virginia. It is fed by eight tributary creeks: Little Tomahawk Creek, Tomahawk Creek, Swift Creek, Otterdale Creek, Deep Creek, West Branch, Dry Creek, and Fuqua Creek. The reservoir provides drinking water, hydro electric power, and a recreational area to Chesterfield residents.

History

The Swift Creek Reservoir was built in 1965 to be a public water supply for surrounding communities.  In 1992, the Watershed Management Committee was established by the Board of Supervisors to protect and preserve the reservoir. They established limits on construction and oversaw development and maintenance of nearby communities. In 2000 the Watershed Management Master Plan was started to reach former goals such as stormwater treatment facilities and reduction of all pollutants. In more recent years projects have been undertaken to improve the infrastructure on and around the reservoir including repairing and replacing multiple bridges.

Real estate

There are two major developments that are built on the waterfront of the reservoir, Brandermill and Woodlake, and many other small neighborhoods.

References

"Swift Creek Important to Chesterfield County | Www.chesterfieldobserver.com | Chesterfield Observer." Swift Creek Important to Chesterfield County | Www.chesterfieldobserver.com | Chesterfield Observer. Web. 28 Oct. 2014.
"County of Chesterfield, VA | Swift Creek Reservoir and Watershed - Environmental Engineering." County of Chesterfield, VA | Swift Creek Reservoir and Watershed - Environmental Engineering. Web. 28 Oct. 2014.

Buildings and structures in Chesterfield County, Virginia
Reservoirs in Virginia